Pouteria petiolata is a species of plant in the family Sapotaceae. It is endemic to Brazil.  It is threatened by habitat loss.

References

Flora of Brazil
petiolata
Vulnerable plants
Taxonomy articles created by Polbot
Plants described in 1990